Ryo Nakamura is the name of:

Ryo Nakamura (footballer, born 1989), Japanese footballer
Ryo Nakamura (footballer, born 1996), Japanese footballer